Thomas Richard Dunwoody MBE (born 18 January 1964 in Belfast, Northern Ireland) is a retired British jockey in National Hunt racing. He was a three-time Champion Jockey.

Racing career

Dunwoody's race victories include the King George VI Chase four times - twice on Desert Orchid in 1989 and 1990 and twice on One Man in 1995 and 1996. He also won the 1986 and 1994 Grand Nationals on West Tip and Miinnehoma respectively, the 1988 Cheltenham Gold Cup on Charter Party and the Champion Hurdle on Kribensis. He received the Lester Award for "Jump Jockey of the Year" on five occasions and held the record for most career winners until Tony McCoy passed his total of 1874 winners in 2002.

Charity work
On 18 January 2008, it was reported that Dunwoody and American explorer Doug Stoup had reached the South Pole following a 48-day trek raising money for charity. Their route followed one which had previously been attempted by Ernest Shackleton and was both the first successful completion of that route on foot as well the first successfully completed new route to the South Pole in ten years.

On 29 May 2009, Dunwoody started a 1000 Mile Challenge for charity and walked the same mile 1000 consecutive times in Newmarket for 1000 consecutive hours with the last mile up the home straight of Newmarket racecourse just before the Bunbury Cup on 10 July 2009.

On 26 February 2017, Dunwoody embarked on a walk across Japan, covering a distance of 2,000 miles, to raise money for Sarcoma UK cancer charity. His trek, from Cape Sata on the southern tip of Kyushu to Cape Soya, the northernmost part of Hokkaido, took 101 days.

Strictly Come Dancing
On 25 August 2009 it was announced that he would take part in Series 7 of the BBC's Strictly Come Dancing partnering Lilia Kopylova. The couple were eliminated on the second week.

Personal life
Dunwoody's autobiography is called Obsessed and was published, after his retirement, in the year 2000. He published a second autobiography called Method in My Madness: 10 Years Out of the Saddle in 2009. He is a motivational speaker. In January 2014, he hosted his debut photographic exhibition at St Martin-in-the-Fields featuring images taken in Pakistan, India, Guatemala and Egypt for the charity Brooke Hospital for Animals. His daughter was born in 2015.

Cheltenham Festival winners (18) 

 Cheltenham Gold Cup - (1) Charter Party (1988)
 Champion Hurdle - (1) Kribensis (1990)
 Arkle Challenge Trophy - (3) Waterloo Boy	 (1989), Remittance Man (1991), Ventana Canyon (1996)
 RSA Insurance Novices' Chase - (2) Hanakham (1997), Florida Pearl (1998)
 Champion Bumper - (2) Montelado (1992), Florida Pearl (1997)
 Triumph Hurdle - (2) Kribensis (1988), Paddy's Return (1996)
 Baring Bingham Novices' Hurdle - (1) Thetford Forest (1992)
 County Handicap Hurdle - (2) Thumbs Up (1993), Barna Boy (1997)
 Festival Trophy Handicap Chase - (2) West Tip (1985), Bigsun (1990)
 Johnny Henderson Grand Annual Chase - (1) French Union (1987)
 Pertemps Final - (1) Von Trappe (1995)

Major wins
 Great Britain
 King George VI Chase - (4) Desert Orchid (1989,1990), One Man (1995,1996)
 Grand National - (2) West Tip (1986), Miinnehoma (1994)
 Tingle Creek Chase - (5) Lefrak City (1985), Waterloo Boy (1991, 1992), Sound Man (1995, 1996)
 Henry VIII Novices' Chase - (3) Acre Hill (1990), Wonder Man (1992), Certainly Strong (1995)
 Long Walk Hurdle - (2) Bluff Cove (1987), Princeful (1998)
 Kauto Star Novices' Chase - (3) Von Trappe (1985), Sparkling Flame (1990), Mutare (1991)
 Christmas Hurdle - (3) Kribensis (1988,1989), Mighty Mogul (1992)
 Challow Novices' Hurdle - (1) Tyrone Bridge (1991)
 Tolworth Novices' Hurdle - (1) Behrajan (1999)
 Scilly Isles Novices' Chase - (1) Baydon Star (1994)
 Ascot Chase - (1) Sound Man (1996)
 Betway Bowl - (2) Aquilifer (1991), Docklands Express (1994)
 Aintree Hurdle - (2) Celtic Chief (1988), Morley Street (1992)
 Top Novices' Hurdle - (1) Carobee (1992)
 Mildmay Novices' Chase - (4) Against the Grain (1987), Sparkling Flame (1991), Banjo (1995), Cyborgo (1997)
 Melling Chase - (1) Remittance Man (1992)
 Mersey Novices' Hurdle - (2) Cyborgo (1994), Sanmartino (1997)
 Liverpool Hurdle - (2) Sweet Glow (1994), Trainglot (1997)

 Ireland
 Irish Gold Cup - (2) Dorans Pride (1998), Florida Pearl (1999)
 Irish Grand National - (1) Desert Orchid (1990)
 Ryanair Gold Cup - (1) Dorans Pride (1997)
 Punchestown Champion Chase - (2) Viking Flagship (1993), Celibate (1999)
 John Durkan Memorial Punchestown Chase - (2) 	Merry Gale (1995), Dorans Pride (1997)
 Drinmore Novice Chase - (1) Dorans Pride (1996)
 Racing Post Novice Chase - (1) Chirkpar (1993)
 Savills Chase - (2) Very Promising (1986), Johnny Setaside (1996)
 Slaney Novice Hurdle - (1) Promalee (1998)
 Dr P. J. Moriarty Novice Chase - (2) Flashing Steel (1993), Florida Pearl (1998)
 Herald Champion Novice Hurdle - (3) High Plains (1987), The Proclamation (1989), 	Bayrouge (1993)
 Ryanair Novice Chase - (2) Viking Flagship (1993), Ventana Canyon (1996)
 Alanna Homes Champion Novice Hurdle - (1) Treble Bob (1995)

References

External links
Sunday Times article 20 December, 2009

1964 births
Living people
British Champion jumps jockeys
Sportspeople from Belfast
Jockeys from Northern Ireland